Powdery mildew is a fungal disease that affects a wide range of plants. Powdery mildew diseases are caused by many different species of ascomycete fungi in the order Erysiphales. Powdery mildew is one of the easier plant diseases to identify, as its symptoms are quite distinctive. Infected plants display white powdery spots on the leaves and stems. The lower leaves are the most affected, but the mildew can appear on any above-ground part of the plant. As the disease progresses, the spots get larger and denser as large numbers of asexual spores are formed, and the mildew may spread up and down the length of the plant.

Powdery mildew grows well in environments with high humidity and moderate temperatures. Greenhouses provide an ideal moist, temperate environment for the spread of the disease. This causes harm to agricultural and horticultural practices where powdery mildew may thrive in a greenhouse setting. In an agricultural or horticultural setting, the pathogen can be controlled using chemical methods, bio organic methods, and genetic resistance. It is important to be aware of powdery mildew and its management as the resulting disease can significantly reduce important crop yields.

Reproduction
Powdery mildew fungi can only reproduce on their living cell host and reproduce both sexually and asexually. Sexual reproduction is via chasmothecia (formerly cleistothecium), a type of ascocarp where the genetic material recombines. Powdery mildew fungi must be adapted to their hosts to be able to infect them. Within each ascocarp are several asci. 

Under optimal conditions, ascospores mature and are released to initiate new infections. Conditions necessary for spore maturation differ among species. Asexual reproduction is where the mother fungi and offspring are genetically identical. Powder mildew fungi offspring of wheat and barley species are more successful from asexual reproduction compared to sexual reproduction counterparts.  
The overwintering survival structure produced by the powdery mildew fungi is called the chasmothecia. This is a round, dark, hard resting structure. Because of these characteristics, spores are able to survive throughout the winter and be released in the spring for new infection.

Vectors of transmission
Powdery mildew does not need a vector to spread. Spores are usually carried by air currents from a proliferation site to a new infection site.

Management
In an agricultural setting, the pathogen can be controlled using chemical methods, genetic resistance, and careful farming methods.

Prevention
You can look for powdery mildew resistant varieties in seed catalogs and alternate between resistance varieties and not. This rotation of sunflower varieties prevents pathogen resistance.

Reduce humidity by allowing space between plants for airflow and pruning to thin foliage

Conventional chemical control
Standard fungicides are an effective way to manage powdery mildew disease on plants. Spray programs of conventional fungicides are advised to begin when powdery mildew symptoms and signs are first noticed. Conventional fungicides should be applied on a regular basis for best results against the disease. 

Control is possible with triadimefon and propiconazole. It is also possible with hexaconazole, myclobutanil, and penconazole.

Non-conventional chemical control 
There are some unconventional chemical control methods that offer alternative modes of action. 
The most effective non-conventional methods of chemical control against powdery mildew are milk, natural sulfur (S8), potassium bicarbonate, metal salts, and oils. 
Metal salt fungicides should be applied on a regular basis up until harvest of the host. Sulfur must be applied before the disease has emerged since it prevents fungi spores from germinating. Copper sulfate is an effective fungicide allowed in organic farming, but can cause harm to the host plant. Addition of lime hampers this effect. 

Neem oil effectively manages powdery mildew on many plants by interfering with the fungus' metabolism and terminating spore production. Sulfur and Fish Oil + Sesame Oil is a mixture effective against powdery mildew.

Milk has long been popular with home gardeners and small-scale organic growers as a treatment for powdery mildew. Milk is diluted with water (typically 1:10) and sprayed on susceptible plants at the first sign of infection, or as a preventative measure, with repeated weekly application often controlling or eliminating the disease. Studies have shown milk's effectiveness as comparable to some conventional fungicides, and better than benomyl and fenarimol at higher concentrations. Milk has proven effective in treating powdery mildew of summer squash, pumpkins, grapes, and roses. The exact mechanism of action is unknown, but one known effect is that ferroglobulin, a protein in whey, produces oxygen radicals when exposed to sunlight, and contact with these radicals is damaging to the fungus.

Dilute sprays containing sodium bicarbonate (baking soda) and vegetable or mineral oils in water are often recommended for controlling powdery mildew, but such mixtures have limited and inconsistent efficacy. While sodium bicarbonate has been shown to reduce to growth of mildews in lab tests, sprays containing only baking soda and water are not effective in controlling fungal diseases on infected plants, and high concentrations of sodium are harmful to plants.

Potassium bicarbonate is an effective low-toxicity fungicide against powdery mildew and apple scab.

Another non-conventional chemical treatment involves treating with a solution of calcium silicate. Silicon helps the plant cells defend against fungal attack by degrading haustoria and by producing callose and papilla. With silicon treatment, epidermal cells of wheat are less susceptible to powdery mildew.

Genetic resistance
The Pm3 allele is an effective genetic resistance strategy that protects host species against powdery mildew fungus.

Gene editing

In 2014, researchers Yanpeng Wang et al. have reported that they were able to induce resistance in hexaploid bread wheat to powdery mildew via targeted mutations with the use of CRISPR and TALENS gene-editing technology.

Powdery mildews of various plants

Sunflowers
Sunflower powdery mildew is a disease caused by the pathogens Golovinomyces cichoracearum, Podosphaera xanthii, and Leviellula taurica. The symptoms caused by L. taurica differ from the other pathogen symptoms. Green-yellow spots appear on upper leaf surface.

Wheat, barley and other cereals

Blumeria graminis f. sp. tritici, causes powdery mildew of wheat, whereas f. sp. hordei causes powdery mildew of barley.

Legumes
Legumes, such as soybeans, are affected by Microsphaera diffusa.

Grape

Erysiphe necator (or Uncinula necator) causes powdery mildew of grapes.

Onions
The fungus causing powdery mildew of onions is Leveillula taurica (also known by its anamorph name, Oidiopsis taurica). It also infects the artichoke.

Apples and pears
Podosphaera leucotricha is a fungus that can cause powdery mildew of apples and pears.

Gourds and melons

Multiple species of fungus can cause powdery mildew of cucurbits: cucumbers, squashes (including pumpkins), luffas, melons, and watermelons.

Podosphaera xanthii (a.k.a. Sphaerotheca fuliginea) is the most commonly reported cause on cucurbits. Erysiphe cichoracearum was formerly reported to be the primary causal organism throughout most of the world.

Since 1925, commercial Cucumis melo (cantaloup and muskmelon) production has been engaged in a biological "arms race" against cucurbit powdery mildew (CPM) caused by the fungus Podosphaera xanthii, with new cultivars of melons being developed for resistance to successively arising races of the fungus, identified simply as race 1, race 2, etc. (seven in total by 2004), for races found around the world, and race N1 through N4 for some divergent races native to Japan. Various subraces have been identified, and given names such as race 2U.S., race 3.5, and race 4.5. A new race S was discovered in 2003, and a specific melon cultivar (C. melo var. acidulus 'PI 313970') found resistant to it, then used for backcrossing to increase resistance in other cultivars. Such modern selective breeding of plants for phytopathological resistance to particular fungal races involves a great deal of genetic research; this PI 313970 versus race S case involved multi-stage hybridization to propagate a recessive gene, pm-S in successive generations, and how this may affect other recessive and codominant genes for resistance to other races of P. xanthii "remains to be determined".

A 2004 literature review regarding powdery mildew races that parasitize various cucurbit plants concluded that "race identification is important for basic research and is especially important for the commercial seed industry, which requires accuracy in declaring the type and level of resistance ... in its products". However, identifying specific races was seen as having little utility in horticulture for choosing specific cultivars, because of the rapidity with which the local pathogen population can change geographically, seasonally, and by host plant.

At least three other Erysiphaceae fungi can cause powdery mildew in cucurbits: The most frequent, after P. xanthii, is Erysiphe cichoracearum, the former primary causal organism throughout most of the world. Podosphaera fusca is another, sometimes considered synonymous with P. xanthii. Cucumbers in greenhouse environments have also been reported to be susceptible to Leveillula taurica.

Lilacs
Microsphaera syringae is a fungus that can cause powdery mildew in lilac.

Strawberries
Podosphaera aphanis is the cause of powdery mildew in strawberries and other Rosaceae like Geum rivale (the water avens)

Tree leaves
Sawadaea tulasnei is a fungus that causes powdery mildew on tree leaves. This fungus attacks the leaves of the Acer platanoides (Norway maple) in North America, Great Britain, and Ireland, Acer palmatum (also known as the Japanese maple or smooth Japanese maple).

Oregon grape
Erysiphe berberidis is a fungus that causes powdery mildew on Oregon grape leaves.

Arabidopsis
Golovinomyces orontii causes powdery mildew on Arabidopsis (rockcress) leaves.

Cannabis
Caused by several fungi including Golovinomyces ambrosiae (syn. G. spadiceus) and Podosphaera macularis. See also .

Hyperparasites of powdery mildew
In the family Sphaeropsidaceae of the Sphaeropsidales fungi, species of the genus Cicinnobolus are hyperparasites of powdery mildew.

Ampelomyces quisqualis is an anamorphic fungus that is a hyperparasite of powdery mildews. This parasitism reduces growth and may eventually kill the mildew. Research on biological control of powdery mildews (especially in high-value crops such as grapes) has been ongoing since the 1970s, resulting in the development of fungicides which contain A. quisqualis as the active ingredient.

See also
 Erysiphales
 Oidium (genus)

References

External links

Fungal plant pathogens and diseases
Erysiphales